Adriano Afonso Maleiane (born 6 November 1949) is a Mozambican economist and politician who has served as the Prime Minister of Mozambique since 2022.

Early life and education 
Maleiane graduated in economics at Eduardo Mondlane University and got his master's degree in managerial finance at University of London.

Career 
Between 1991 and 2006 Maleiane served as the governor of the Mozambican central bank, the Bank of Mozambique. He served as chairman and CEO of the Banco Nacional de Investimento (BNI), Mozambique's state-owned development bank, between 2011 and January 2015.

Since 19 January 2015, Maleiane has been serving as the Minister of Economy and Finance in President Filipe Nyusi's cabinet. on 2 March 2022, Maleiane was dismissed from his position by Nyusi. He was then appointed Prime Minister on 3 March 2022.

Other activities 
 International Monetary Fund (IMF), ex officio member of the Board of Governors
 Islamic Development Bank (IsDB), Ex-Officio Member of the Board of Governors

References

Further reading 
 An Interview with Adriano Maleiane at the World Bank website

1949 births
Mozambican economists
Economy ministers of Mozambique
Finance ministers of Mozambique
Central bankers
Living people
Alumni of the University of London
FRELIMO politicians
Prime Ministers of Mozambique